Henry Reilly is a DUP Unionist Councillor on Newry, Mourne and Down District Council.

Reilly grew up on a farm in County Down and worked for the Department of Agriculture and Rural Development.  He joined the Ulster Unionist Party (UUP), and was first elected to Newry and Mourne District Council at the 1989 local elections.  He held his seat in the Mournes in 1993, 1997, 2001 and 2005, serving as Mayor of Newry in 2004/05.

Initially a supporter of UUP leader David Trimble, by 2004, Reilly was publicly calling for him to resign.  In 2007, Reilly left the UUP and then went on to join the UK Independence Party (UKIP), becoming its first councillor in Northern Ireland.  He was subsequently appointed as Chairman of the Northern Ireland Regional branch of the party.  This grew from 80 members to more than 200 after David McNarry defected to the party in 2012; McNarry was elected as the new leader of the party in Northern Ireland, but Reilly kept the title of Chairman.

Under his new party label, Reilly stood in South Down at the 2007 Northern Ireland Assembly election, taking 2.7% of the vote.  He stood again in 2011, increasing his first preference vote share to 5.6%, but he still missed out on election.  However, he easily held his council seat at the 2011 Northern Ireland local elections, then, following reorganisation of local government, took a seat on the new Newry, Mourne and Down District Council in 2014.

Reilly stood as UKIP's candidate at the 2014 European Parliament election, taking seventh position, with 24,584 first preference votes.  He also stood at the 2015 UK general election in South Down, coming in fifth place, with 7.1% of the vote.

Reilly was suspended from UKIP in September 2015 for bringing the party into disrepute. After a suspension of two months, UKIP's National Executive Committee formally expelled Reilly from the party in November 2015.

After briefly sitting as an Independent, Reilly then joined the Traditional Unionist Voice, maintaining his seat on the council for that party. In November 2016, just one year after joining the TUV, he resigned from it. The reason he cited for leaving was having commenced employment with a charity which required him to be politically unaligned. Just three months later, in February 2017, Reilly began publicly supporting the DUP and formally endorsed Jim Wells in the 2017 Northern Ireland Assembly Election.

Reilly has notably been charged with two counts of assaulting a female police officer on 30 September 2019, and is also charged with resisting the female constable, resisting a male constable and causing criminal damage to a police radio and earpiece on the same date. Reilly was due to go on trial at Newry Magistrates’ Court in 2020, however this was adjourned due to Covid-19 crisis. - https://www.armaghi.com/news/newry-news/trial-of-councillor-accused-of-assault-on-female-police-office-adjourned-due-to-covid-19-crisis/106504

References

Year of birth missing (living people)
Living people
Members of Newry and Mourne District Council
Mayors of places in Northern Ireland
People from County Down
Traditional Unionist Voice politicians
UK Independence Party politicians